Enos falerina is a butterfly in the family Lycaenidae. It is found in the Guianas, the Amazon region, Colombia, Peru and Guatemala.

References

External links

Butterflies described in 1867
Eumaeini
Lycaenidae of South America
Taxa named by William Chapman Hewitson